Zinc finger protein basonuclin-2 is a protein that in humans is encoded by the BNC2 gene.
BCN2 has recently been shown to influence skin pigmentation levels in Europeans. Genomic region spanning the BCN2 gene has 60% Neanderthal DNA sequence.

See also 
 Chromosome 9 (human)
 Zinc finger protein

References

Further reading